Chigwell was a parliamentary constituency represented in the House of Commons of the Parliament of the United Kingdom from 1955 to 1974. It elected one Member of Parliament (MP) by the first past the post system of election.

History 
The constituency was created for the 1955 general election as a result of the First Periodic Review of Westminster constituencies.  The seat was abolished by the Second Review for the February 1974 general election when the bulk of the electorate formed the basis of the new constituency of Epping Forest, together with parts of the abolished constituency of Epping.

Boundaries
The constituency consisted of the Urban District of Chigwell and the Rural District of Ongar.

Chigwell was transferred from Woodford and the Rural District of Ongar from Chelmsford.

On abolition, Chigwell, which comprised the bulk of the constituency, was included in the new County Constituency of Epping Forest.  The Rural District of Ongar (now part of the merged Rural District of Epping and Ongar) was included in the new County Constituency of Brentwood and Ongar.  A small part in the south (part of Hainault) had been absorbed into the London Borough of Redbridge on its creation within Greater London and was now added to the Borough Constituency of Ilford North.

Members of Parliament

Elections

Elections in the 1950s

Elections in the 1960s

Elections in the 1970s

Boundary changes

References

Sources

Parliamentary constituencies in Essex (historic)
Constituencies of the Parliament of the United Kingdom established in 1955
Constituencies of the Parliament of the United Kingdom disestablished in 1974